= Sherwin House =

Building in Nottingham, England

Coordinates: 52°57′8″N 1°8′40″W

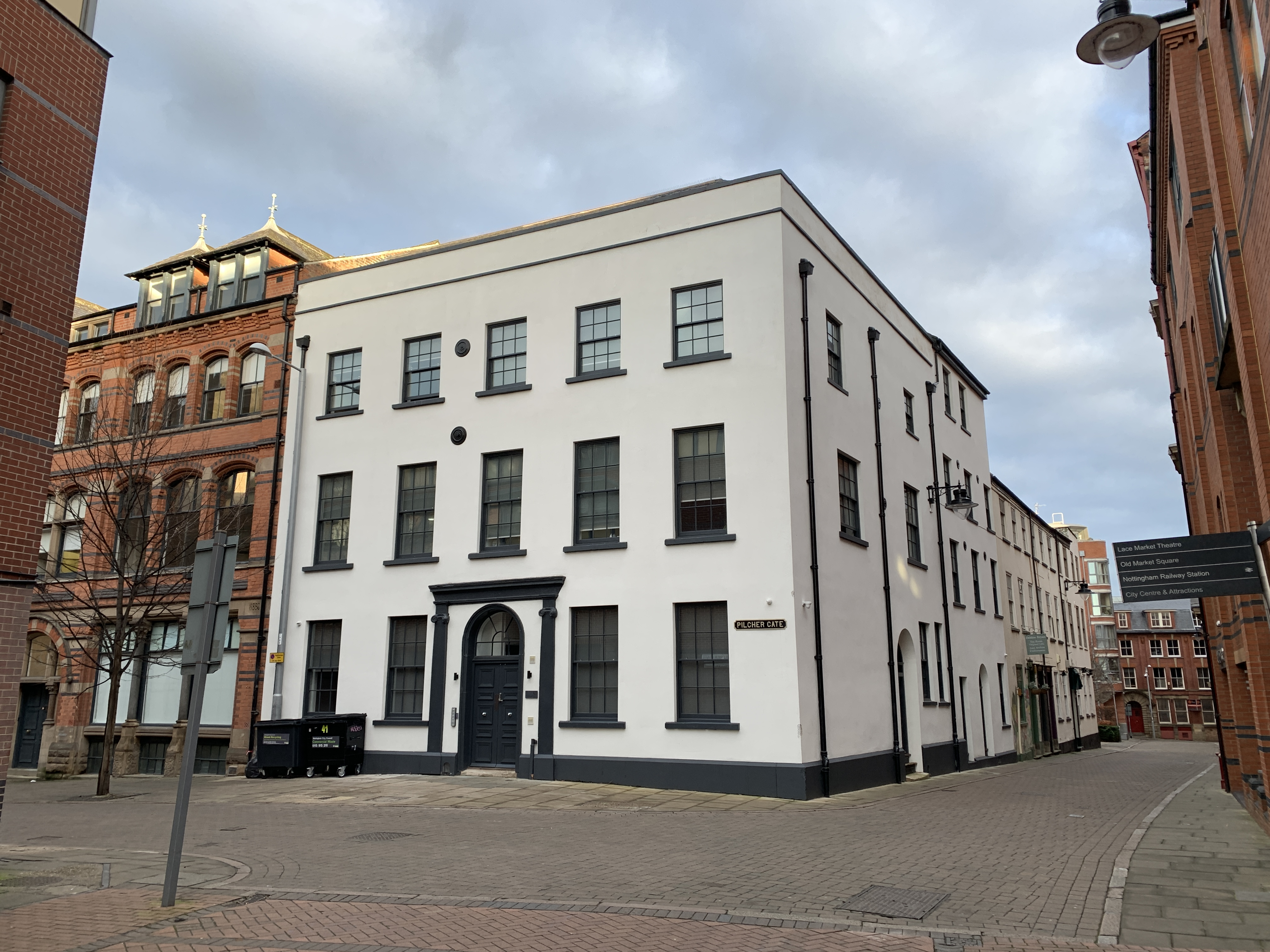
- Sherwin House, 41 Pilcher Gate, Nottingham

- Location within Nottingham
- Alternative names: Sherwin House

General information
- Location: 41 Pilcher Gate, Nottingham
- Estimated completion: 1699
- Client: John Sherwin

Design and construction
- Designations: Grade II listed

Sherwin House, a Grade II listed building on Pilcher Gate, is the oldest surviving town house in Nottingham.

== History ==
It was erected between 1689 and 1699 for the Sherwin family. The building is noted for its Jacobean staircase which is the only substantial staircase to survive in Nottingham from prior to 1700.

On the South Prospect of Nottingham drawn in 1742 by Thomas Sandby, the property is shown as having three gables on the south front, and two gables on the west side.

The building was owned by the Sherwin family until the death of John Sherwin on 15 March 1800 it passed to his nephew John Longdon. By 1807 it was owned by Mr. Bigsby, attorney-at-law, who made substantial alterations including stuccoing the exterior facade. A north east wing was added before 1820. The gardens of the property were gradually sold off for building of other houses and in 1884 Pilcher gate was widened which resulted in the loss of the railings and front yard or 65 square yards (54 m^{2}) for a price of £780 (equivalent to £83,800 in 2025).. Another wing was added in the rear courtyard around 1886 when the building was converted into a lace warehouse.

The property lay derelict for many years and demolition was proposed, but in 2013, Mabec Properties started a project to stabilise the structure. Belfast developer Green Door converted it into office space and residential apartments in a scheme approved in 2016. It re-opened in 2021 as office space and residential apartments.
